Sergio Olhovich (born 9 October 1941) is a Russian-Mexican film director and screenwriter. He directed 18 films between 1970 and 1999. His 1975 film The House in the South was entered into the 9th Moscow International Film Festival. In 1997, he was a member of the jury at the 20th Moscow International Film Festival.

Selected filmography
 The House in the South (1975)

References

External links

1941 births
Ariel Award winners
Best Director Ariel Award winners
Living people
Mexican film directors
Mexican screenwriters
Russian film directors
Russian screenwriters
Male screenwriters
Russian male writers
People from Sumatra